This is a list of television programs formerly or currently broadcast by Comedy Central in the United States and some other countries.

Current programming

Original programming

Scripted

Animation
 South Park (1997)
 Fairview (2022)
 Tooning Out the News (season 3) (2022; moved from Paramount+)

Live-action
 Crank Yankers (2002–07; 2019)
 Awkwafina Is Nora from Queens (2020)

Unscripted

Variety
 The Daily Show (1996)
 Hell of a Week with Charlamagne tha God (2021)

Syndicated programming
 The Office (2018)
 Parks and Recreation (2019)
 Seinfeld (2021)
 Brooklyn Nine-Nine (2022)
 Reno 911! (2022)
 Beavis and Butt-Head (2005–2008, 2011, 2022, 2023)

Upcoming programming

Original programming

Live-action series
 The New Kings & Queens of Comedy (TBA)

Animated series 
 Digman! (March 22, 2023)
 Everybody Still Hates Chris (TBA; will also stream on Paramount+)
 The Ren & Stimpy Show (TBA)

Animated films 
 Jodie (TBA)
 Washingtonia (TBA)

Specials 
 John Mulaney & the Sack Lunch Bunch specials (TBA)

Former programming

Original programming

Scripted programming

Animation

 Dr. Katz, Professional Therapist (1995–99; 2002)
 Kid Notorious (2003)
 Shorties Watchin' Shorties (2004)
 Drawn Together (2004–07)
 Freak Show (2006)
 Lil' Bush (2007–08)
 Futurama (2008–13)
 Ugly Americans (2010–12)
 Brickleberry (2012–15)
 TripTank (2014–16)
 Moonbeam City (2015)
 Legends of Chamberlain Heights (2016–17)
 Jeff & Some Aliens (2017)

Live-action

 The Higgins Boys and Gruber (1991)
 Mystery Science Theater 3000 (1991–96)
 Short Attention Span Theater (1991–95)
 The Big Room (1991–92)
 Random Acts of Variety (1991–94)
 Access America (1991–92)
 Afterdrive (1991)
 Sports Monster (1991)
 Limboland (1994)
 Offsides with Dom Irrera (1994–97)
 The Vacant Lot (1994)
 The Clinic (1995)
 Exit 57 (1995–96)
 Canned Ham (1996–2002)
 Pulp Comics (1996–2000)
 Viva Variety (1997–98)
 Upright Citizens Brigade (1998–2000)
 Frank Leaves for the Orient (1999)
 The Man Show (1999–2004)
 Strangers with Candy (1999–2000)
 Strip Mall (2000–01)
 TV Funhouse (2000–01)
 The Chris Wylde Show Starring Chris Wylde (2001)
 Insomniac with Dave Attell (2001–04)
 That's My Bush! (2001)
 Contest Searchlight (2002)
 Heroes of Black Comedy (2002)
 Heroes of Jewish Comedy (2002)
 The Sweet Spot (2002)
 Chappelle's Show (2003–06)
 Gerhard Reinke's Wanderlust (2003)
 I'm With Busey (2003)
 Reno 911! (2003–09)
 Trigger Happy TV (U.S. version) (2003)
 Blue Collar TV (2004–06)
 Crossballs (2004)
 Jump Cuts (2004)
 Last Laugh (2004–07) (specials)
 Wanda Does It (2004)
 Comedians of Comedy (2005)
 The Hollow Men (2005)
 Mind of Mencia (2005–08)
 Stella (2005)
 Dog Bites Man (2006)
 American Body Shop (2007)
 Halfway Home (2007)
 The Sarah Silverman Program (2007–10)
 Atom TV (2008–2010)
 Chocolate News (2008)
 Lewis Black's Root of All Evil (2008)
 Important Things with Demetri Martin (2009–10)
 The Jeff Dunham Show (2009)
 Kröd Mändoon and the Flaming Sword of Fire (2009)
 Michael & Michael Have Issues (2009)
 Secret Girlfriend (2009)
 The Benson Interruption (2010)
 Big Lake (2010)
 Nick Swardson's Pretend Time (2010–11)
 Jon Benjamin Has a Van (2011)
 Workaholics (2011–2017)
 The Burn with Jeff Ross (2012–13)
 Mash Up (2012)
 Inside Amy Schumer (2012–16)
 Key & Peele (2012–15)
 The Ben Show (2013)
 Brody Stevens: Enjoy It! (2013–14)
 Drunk History (2013–19)
 Kroll Show (2013–15)
 Nathan for You (2013–17)
 Broad City (2014–19)
 Meet the Creeps (2014)
 Review (2014–17)
 Another Period (2015–18)
 Big Time in Hollywood, FL (2015)
 Idiotsitter (2016–17)
 Time Traveling Bong (2016)
 Detroiters (2017–18)
 The High Court with Doug Benson (2017)
 The Jim Jefferies Show (2017–19)
 Corporate (2018–20)
 Best of The Comedy Central Roast (2019)
 Alternatino with Arturo Castro (2019)
 The Other Two (2019)
 South Side (2019)
 Hall of Flame: Top 100 Comedy Central Roast Moments (2021) (miniseries)
 Doing the Most with Phoebe Robinson (2021)

Stand-up programming

 Stand-Up Stand-Up (1991–95)
 London Underground (1991–96)
 Two Drink Minimum (1991–96)
 Women Aloud (1992–94)
 Tompkins Square (1996)
 Premium Blend (1997–2006)
 Lounge Lizards (1997)
 Comedy Central Presents (1998–2011)
 The World Stands Up (2004)
 Friday Night Stand-Up with Greg Giraldo (2005–06)
 Live at Gotham (2006–09)
 John Oliver's New York Stand Up Show (2010–13)
 Russell Simmons Presents: Stand-Up at the El Rey (2010)
 Gabriel Iglesias Presents Stand Up Revolution (2011–14)
 Russell Simmons Presents: The Ruckus (2011)
 Comedy Central Stand-Up Presents (2012–19)
 Adam DeVine's House Party (2013–16)
 Comedy Underground with Dave Attell (2014)
 The Meltdown with Jonah and Kumail (2014–16)
 This Is Not Happening (2015–19)
 Kevin Hart Presents: Hart of the City (2016–19)
 The Comedy Jam (2017)
 Hood Adjacent with James Davis (2017)
 Kevin Hart Presents: The Next Level (2017–18)
 This Week at the Comedy Cellar (2018–20)
 The New Negroes with Baron Vaughn and Open Mike Eagle (2019)
 Good Talk with Anthony Jeselnik (2019)
 Bill Burr Presents: The Ringers (2020)

Competitive/game shows
 Clash! (1991)
 Make Me Laugh (1997–98)
 Win Ben Stein's Money (1997–2003)
 VS. (1999)
 Don't Forget Your Toothbrush (U.S. version) (2000)
 Beat the Geeks (2001–02)
 Let's Bowl (2001–02)
 Distraction (U.S. version) (2005–06)
 The Gong Show with Dave Attell  (2008)

Sports programming
 Battlebots (2000–02)

Late night/talk shows

 Night After Night with Allan Havey (1991–92)
 Alan King: Inside the Comedy Mind (1991–95)
 Politically Incorrect (1994–97)
 Turn Ben Stein On (1999–2001)
 Primetime Glick (2001–03)
 Tough Crowd with Colin Quinn (2003–04)
 The Graham Norton Effect (U.S. version) (2004)
 The Colbert Report (2005–14)
 The Showbiz Show with David Spade (2005–07)
 Too Late with Adam Carolla (2005)
 Weekends at the D.L. (2005)
 Tosh.0 (2009–20)
 Sports Show with Norm Macdonald (2011)
 @midnight with Chris Hardwick (2013–17)
 The Jeselnik Offensive (2013)
 The Nightly Show with Larry Wilmore (2015–16)
 Why? with Hannibal Buress (2015)
 The Gorburger Show (2017)
 The Opposition with Jordan Klepper (2017–2018)
 The President Show (2017)
 Problematic with Moshe Kasher (2017)
 Taskmaster (2018)
 Getting Closure with Sydnee Washington (2019–20)
 Klepper (2019)
 Lights Out with David Spade (2019–20)

Other programming
 Comics Only (1991–95) (hosted by Paul Provenza)
 Comic Justice (1993–94)
 Out There (1993–94)
 Travel Sick (2001–02)
 Comic Groove (2002)
 Comic Remix (2002)
 Straight Plan for the Gay Man (2004)
 Con (2005)
 Reality Bites Back (2008)
 Onion SportsDome (2011)

Syndicated programming

 30 Rock (2011–14)
 1000 Ways to Die (2016–17)
 The Abbott and Costello Show (1991; 1993)
 All Is Forgiven (June 1991)
 Absolutely Fabulous (1994–2003)
 Action (1999)
 Almost Live! (1992–94)
 Archer (2015–19)
 The Associates (1991)
 The Bad News Bears (1991)
 The Ben Stiller Show (1995–96)
 The Benny Hill Show (1993–96)
 The Best of Groucho (1991–92)
 Best of the West (1991)
 Bob & Carol & Ted & Alice (April/October 1991)
 Bob and Margaret (1998–2000)
 BoJack Horseman (2018–19; 2020)
 Bridget Loves Bernie (December 1991)
 Camp Runamuck (1991–92)
 Candid Camera (1991–93)
 Captain Nice (1991)
 Car 54, Where Are You? (1991–92)
 The Charmings (1991)
 Clerks: The Animated Series (2002)
 The Cleveland Show (2018—22)
 Community (2013–15)
 C.P.O. Sharkey (1991–92)
 Creature Comforts (2004–05)
 The Critic (1996–2005)
 Dilbert (2001–05)
 Duckman (2000–06)
 Dream On (1996–99)
 Drive In Reviews (1993)
 The Duck Factory (1991–96)
 Entourage (2011–14)
 Fractured Flickers (1991)
 Fresno (June 1991)
 Friends (2019; 2021–22)
 Futurama (2013–23)
 Gary & Mike (2002–03)
 Glenn Martin, DDS (2009–10)
 The Goode Family (2010–11)
 The Harper House (2021)
 How I Met Your Mother (2016–17)
 In Living Color (2009)
 It's Always Sunny In Philadelphia (2010–17)
 The Jack Benny Program (1991–93)
 Just Shoot Me! (2008–10)
 Kenny vs. Spenny (2007)
 The Kids in the Hall (1991–2005)
 King of the Hill (2018–19)
 Lancelot Link, Secret Chimp (1991–92)
 The Late Late Show with James Corden (2020)
 Late Night with Conan O'Brien
 Laurel and Hardy (1991–92)
 The League of Gentlemen (2000)
 Love, American Style (1991–93)
 The Lucy Show (1991)
 MADtv (2004–10)
 Married... with Children (2010–11)
 McHale's Navy (1991–93)
 Monty Python's Flying Circus (1991–96)
 Mr. Show with Bob and David (2005–07)
 The New Candid Camera (1992)
 Occasional Wife (1992)
 One Night Stand (1991–2000)
 The Phil Silvers Show (1991–92)
 Phyllis (1991–93; 1995)
 Police Squad! (1993–2000)
 Quark (1991–92)
 Rhoda (1991–93; 1995)
 Saturday Night Live (1991–2003)
 Schitt's Creek (2020–22)
 Scrubs (2006–13, 2017–19)
 SCTV (1991–94)
 Sit Down, Shut Up (2010)
 Soap (1994–2001)
 Sports Night (2000–02)
 Star Trek: Lower Decks (2021)
 The State (2010)
 The Steve Allen Show (1991–93)
 Tabitha (April–July 1991)
 The Texas Wheelers (May 1991)
 That '70s Show (2017–19; 2020)
 That Girl (1991–92)
 The Tick (1996–99)
 The Tony Randall Show (1991; 1993)
 The Tracey Ullman Show (1995–98)
 TV's Bloopers and Practical Jokes (1991–92)
 Undergrads (2002–03)
 When Things Were Rotten (1991)
 Whose Line Is It Anyway? (1991–98; 2000–05)
 Wonder Showzen (2005)
 Working Stiffs (1991)
 The Young Ones (1994)
 Your Show of Shows (1991–92)

Events and specials
 Comedy Central Roast (2003)
 The Comedy Awards (2011–12)
 South Park The 25th Anniversary Concert (2022)

Films

Comedy Central original movies
 Porn 'n Chicken (2002)
 Windy City Heat (2003)
 Knee High P.I. (2003)
 A Clüsterfünke Christmas (2021)
 Hot Mess Holiday (2021)
 Out of Office (2022)
 Cursed Friends (2022)
 Reno 911! It's a Wonderful Heist (2022)

Comedy Central films

These are films that were theatrically released and based on Comedy Central properties.
 South Park: Bigger, Longer & Uncut (1999) (with Paramount Pictures and Warner Bros. Pictures)
 The Hebrew Hammer (2003) (with ContentFilm and Strand Releasing)
 Strangers with Candy (2006) (with THINKFilm)
 Reno 911!: Miami (2007) (with 20th Century Fox, Paramount Pictures, and Jersey Films)
 New Kids Turbo (2010) (United States)
 The Drawn Together Movie: The Movie! (2010)
 New Kids Nitro (2011) (United States)

Notes

References

 
Comedy Central